Parastilbe is a genus of parasitic sea snails, marine gastropod mollusks in the family Eulimidae.

Species
 Parastilbe acuta (Jeffreys, 1884)

References

 Cossmann, M. (1900) Rectifications de nomenclature. Revue Critique de Paléozoologie, 4: 42–46

External links
 To World Register of Marine Species

Eulimidae